In theoretical physics, the Mandelstam variables are numerical quantities that encode the energy, momentum, and angles of particles in a scattering process in a Lorentz-invariant fashion. They are used for scattering processes of two particles to two particles. The Mandelstam variables were first introduced by physicist Stanley Mandelstam in 1958.

If the Minkowski metric is chosen to be , the Mandelstam variables  are then defined by

,
where p1 and p2 are the four-momenta of the incoming particles and p3 and p4 are the four-momenta of the outgoing particles.

Feynman diagrams
The letters s,t,u are also used in the terms s-channel (timelike channel), t-channel, and u-channel (both spacelike channels). These channels represent different Feynman diagrams or different possible scattering events where the interaction involves the exchange of an intermediate particle whose squared four-momentum equals s,t,u, respectively.

{|cellpadding="10"
|
|
|
|-
|align="center"|s-channel
|align="center"|t-channel
|align="center"|u-channel
|}
For example, the s-channel corresponds to the particles 1,2 joining into an intermediate particle that eventually splits into 3,4:  The t-channel represents the process in which the particle 1 emits the intermediate particle and becomes the final particle 3, while the particle 2 absorbs the intermediate particle and becomes 4. The u-channel is the t-channel with the role of the particles 3,4 interchanged.

When evaluating a Feynman amplitude one often finds scalar products of the external four momenta. One can use the Mandelstam variables to simplify these:

  

Where  is the mass of the particle with corresponding momentum .

Sum
Note that

where mi is the mass of particle i.

To prove this, we need to use two facts:
The square of a particle's four momentum is the square of its mass,

And conservation of four-momentum,

So, to begin,

Then adding the three while inserting squared masses leads to,

Then note that the last four terms add up to zero using conservation of four-momentum,

So finally,
.

Relativistic limit
In the relativistic limit, the momentum (speed) is large, so using the relativistic energy-momentum equation, the energy becomes essentially the momentum norm (e.g.  becomes  ).  The rest mass can also be neglected.

So for example,

Thus,
{|
|align="right"|
|align="right"|
|align="right"|
|-
|align="right"|
|
|
|-
|align="right"|
|
|
|}

See also
Feynman diagrams
Bhabha scattering
Møller scattering
Compton scattering

References

Kinematics (particle physics)
Scattering
Quantum field theory